Łopuchowo may refer to the following places in Poland:
Łopuchowo, Greater Poland Voivodeship (west-central Poland)
Łopuchowo, Białystok County in Podlaskie Voivodeship (north-east Poland)
Łopuchowo, Sejny County in Podlaskie Voivodeship (north-east Poland)
Łopuchowo, Suwałki County in Podlaskie Voivodeship (north-east Poland)